Olympiastadion is the German, Finnish and Swedish word for Olympic Stadium and may refer to:

 Stockholm Olympic Stadium, the host of the 1912 Summer Olympics (though mostly referred as simply Stockholms Stadion)
 Olympiastadion (Berlin), the host of the 1936 Summer Olympics
 Helsinki Olympic Stadium, the host of the 1952 Summer Olympics
 Olympiastadion (Munich), the host of the 1972 Summer Olympics
 Olympia (Helsingborg), sometimes referred to as Olympiastadion
 Jan Breydel Stadium, formerly known as the Olympiastadion

See also
 Olympic Stadium
 Olympia-Stadion (Berlin U-Bahn)
 Berlin Olympiastadion station